Chantal Serre (born August 28, 1950 – May 26, 2015) is a French former footballer who played as a Defender for Reims of the Division 1 Féminine.

International career

Serre represented France at the 1971 Women's World Cup. She earned two caps for the France national team, from 1971 to 1972.

References

1950 births
2015 deaths
French women's footballers
Division 1 Féminine players
Stade de Reims Féminines players
Women's association football defenders
France women's international footballers